Pemba Tamang (born 11 March 1980) is an Indian sport shooter. He won the gold medal in the Men's 25 metre rapid fire pistol (Pairs) with Vijay Kumar and the silver medal in the Men's 25 metre rapid fire pistol at the 2006 Commonwealth Games.

The Indian trio of Pemba Tamang, Vijay Kumar and Gurpreet Singh won the silver medal in the 25m centre fire event at the 2014 Asian Games, held at Incheon, South Korea. The team scored a total of 1740, two behind gold medalists China.

References

1980 births
Living people
Indian male sport shooters
ISSF pistol shooters
Commonwealth Games gold medallists for India
Commonwealth Games silver medallists for India
Shooters at the 2006 Commonwealth Games
Indian Gorkhas
Asian Games medalists in shooting
Shooters at the 2010 Asian Games
Shooters at the 2014 Asian Games
Commonwealth Games medallists in shooting
Asian Games silver medalists for India
Medalists at the 2014 Asian Games
Tamang people
21st-century Indian people
Medallists at the 2006 Commonwealth Games